Ashland is an unincorporated community in Franklin County, in the U.S. state of Georgia.

History
The community served as a rural trading point. A post office called Ashland was established in 1887, and remained in operation until 1953.

References

Unincorporated communities in Franklin County, Georgia